Augustus, Duke of Saxe-Gotha-Altenburg (full name: Emil Leopold August) (23 November 1772 — 17 May 1822), was a Duke of Saxe-Gotha-Altenburg, and the author of one of the first modern novels to treat of homoerotic love.  He was the maternal grandfather of Prince Albert, consort of Queen Victoria.

Early life
He was born on 23 November 1772 in Gotha, the second son of Ernst II, Duke of Saxe-Gotha-Altenburg and Princess Charlotte of Saxe-Meiningen. In 1779 the death of his older brother Ernst made him heir to the duchy of Saxe-Gotha-Altenburg. In his youth he was very well educated, and his environment—sympathetic to the Jacobins—impressed on him the ideals of freedom, equality and fraternity.

Reign
He was already a supporter of Napoleon Bonaparte when he succeeded his father in 1804, which was an advantage in the Napoleonic wars. Saxe-Gotha-Altenburg joined the Rhine Confederation in 1806. When the French Army marched into his duchy in this year, August remained in Gotha and thus prevented a potential escalation. He also stood up for the imprisoned critical journalist Rudolph Zacharias Becker and persuaded the military commander to swiftly set him free.

The following visits by Napoleon to the town (some of them very short) and meetings with Duke Augustus are known:

23 July 1807 (reception at the Schloss and lunch with the Duke and Duchess)
27 September 1808 (on the way to the Congress of Erfurt, meeting with the Duke and dinner at the Schloss) 
14 October 1808 (return from the Congress of Erfurt, stop at Schloss Friedrichsthal and brief meeting with Augustus) 
15 December 1812 (on the way to Russia, no meeting with Augustus)
25 October 1813 (return from Russia, overnight stay at the inn Zum Mohren, no meeting with Augustus).

From 1811 to 1813 the Duke celebrated Napoleon's birthday on 15 August with a gala reception at Schloss Friedenstein. In 1807 he had acquired one of Napoleon's bicorn hats from his servant Louis Constant Wairy, which is displayed to this day at Friedenstein. On Napoleon's visit on 23 July 1807, August gave the French Emperor an extravagant black carriage, which Napoleon however declined to use, due to its similarity with a death's head. Augustus' Napoleon obsession peaked when he built a Napoleon room in Schloss Friedenstein in the Empire style, which he had designed personally — still a highlight of the museum today. The room's ceiling shows a starry sky with sun and moon, while the sun shows features of Napoleon, and the moon shows Augustus' face.

Augustus was known as a patron and collector of art, but had an aversion to hunting or riding. Carl Maria von Weber (whose debts he paid) dedicated his 2nd piano concerto to him out of gratitude. He was also seen as an eccentric, with a penchant for shocking or provocative appearances. Johann Wolfgang von Goethe described him as "pleasant and distasteful at the same time" and noted: "I can not complain about him, but it was always a nervous matter accepting an invitation to his table, as one could not predict which of the guests of honour he might decide on a whim to treat mercilessly". His tendency towards transvestism is characteristic: he liked to appear in women's clothing and thereby shock the court of Gotha. The well-known painter Caroline Louise Seidler, who was at the court of Gotha in the winter of 1811 to paint the Duke's family, described him as the "greatest original of his time," whose appearance had something "lady-like" about it. He also had a preference for dancing, wearing silk socks and feminine clothes. He called himself "Emilie" among his friends. There are references to a possible homosexuality  in his literary works. In 1805 he published anonymously the poetic novel A Year in Arcadia: Kyllenion. This is a pastoral idyll, set in ancient Greece, in which several couples fall in love, overcome various obstacles and live happily ever after. It is unique in that one of the couples is homosexual and their love affair is treated no differently from that of any of the others. This is perhaps the first novel since antiquity in which same-sex love is so treated. A man of great culture, Augustus was also in correspondence with Jean Paul, Madame de Stäel and Bettina von Arnim.

He died on 17 May 1822 in Gotha. The circumstances of his sudden death after a brief illness are unclear.

Succeeded by his brother Frederick as Duke, Augustus was buried on an island in the lake of the Schlosspark on a crypt specially decorated for him, and where his second wife Karoline Amalie was also buried in 1848. Like the other graves of the Duke's family, his tomb is not marked with any monument. The simple floral oval, which once marked the tomb, has not been recognisable for decades, and thus the exact burial location of the couple is unknown.

Marriages and issue
In Ludwigslust on 21 October 1797 Augustus married firstly Louise Charlotte of Mecklenburg-Schwerin. They had one child, a daughter:
 Louise Dorothea Pauline Charlotte Fredericka Auguste (b. Gotha, 21 December 1800 – d. Paris, 30 August 1831). She married firstly on 31 July 1817 Ernst I, Duke of Saxe-Coburg, but they divorced in 1826; secondly, on 18 October 1826 Alexander von Hanstein, created count von Pölzig. Louise was to become the mother of Albert of Saxe-Coburg-Gotha, husband of Queen Victoria, and through him, Augustus is the ancestor of all British monarchs beginning with Edward VII, and of numerous reigning monarchs across Europe.

Duchess Louise Charlotte died on 4 January 1801, two weeks after giving birth to Louise. Fifteen months later, on 24 April 1802, Augustus married in Kassel Karoline Amalie of Hesse-Kassel. They had no children, and became estranged soon after marrying, because "their mutual points of view about life are completely different". Appearances together in public became rare after 1810, and after 1813 Karoline Amalie no longer lived at Schloss Friedenstein with Augustus, but at Schloss Friedrichsthal.

Anecdotes
"At the Congress of Erfurt in 1808, Napoleon sat opposite the Duke at dinner, and as the latter ate little or nothing, Napoleon asked him why he was not eating anything, whereupon the latter gallantly replied: 'I am nourishing myself from the rays of the sun, which now shines at me.' To Napoleon's question, how big his country was, he responded: 'Sire, as big as your Majesty orders."

On the way to the Congress of Erfurt, Napoleon made a stop in 1808 at the Friedenstein. In conversation with Duke Augustus the Emperor asked for a cup of hot chocolate. This was brought to him by the Duke himself with the remark that this cup had been made in his own porcelain factory. Napoleon's request to be able to keep the fine cup as a souvenir, however, was denied by the Duke. To the Emperor's stern question, why this was not possible, Augustus replied that he would rather give him his duchy. For the great French Emperor had just drunk from this very cup, and he, Augustus, would in future hold it in honour like a rare antique. Napoleon showed himself very flattered by this.

Ancestry

References

Further reading

 August, Herzog von Sachsen-Gotha, Kyllenion  Ein Jahr in Arkadien (1805; reprint Berlin 1985 with biographic info.)
 
 

|-

1772 births
1822 deaths
People from Saxe-Gotha-Altenburg
People from Gotha (town)
House of Saxe-Gotha-Altenburg
Dukes of Saxe-Gotha-Altenburg